Denazinosuchus is a genus of goniopholidid mesoeucrocodylian. Its fossils have been recovered from the Upper Cretaceous Fruitland Formation and Kirtland Formation (late Campanian-early Maastrichtian) of the San Juan Basin, New Mexico.  It is the most abundant and readily identifiable mesoeucrocodylian of the San Juan Basin, mostly due to its distinctive subrectangular, flattened, and sparsely pitted bony armor. It was first described in 1932 by Carl Wiman on the basis of a skull as a species of Goniopholis, G. kirtlandicus. Spencer G. Lucas and Robert M. Sullivan redescribed the species in 2003 and gave it its own genus, Denazinosuchus. To date, Denazinosuchus is only known from skull material, armor, and a thigh bone.

References

Late Cretaceous reptiles of North America
Late Cretaceous crocodylomorphs of North America
Taxa named by Spencer G. Lucas
Taxa named by Robert M. Sullivan
Fossil taxa described in 2003
Prehistoric pseudosuchian genera